The LNWR 5ft 6in Tank was a class of 160 passenger 2-4-2T locomotives manufactured by the London and North Western Railway in their Crewe Works between 1890 and 1897.

Design
The design featured a boiler pressed to  delivering saturated steam to two  cylinders connected by Joy valve gear to the driving wheels.

They were effectively a tank version of the LNWR Webb Precursor Class, which were then being withdrawn.

Service
Three locomotives were withdrawn before the 1923 Grouping; the remaining 157 locomotive passed to the London, Midland and Scottish Railway who renumbered them 6600–6757, and gave them power classification 1P.

Forty-two locomotives were fitted up between 1929 and 1932 by the LMS for push-pull train service.

Two were sold to the War Department in 1930 and 1931; they served on the Longmoor Military Railway where they were became LMR 22 Earl Haig and LMR 23 Earl Roberts. No. 22 was scrapped circa 1939, No. 23 lasted long enough to be renumbered WD 206, but was scrapped during the war.

Forty-three survived to British Railways service in 1948; their numbers were increased by 40000. The last of the class was withdrawn in September 1955 and none were preserved.

References

2-4-2T locomotives
London and North Western Railway locomotives
Railway locomotives introduced in 1890
Standard gauge steam locomotives of Great Britain
War Department locomotives
Scrapped locomotives